Aurora Cornu (6 December 1931 – 14 March 2021) was a Romanian-born French writer, actress, film director, and translator. Her best known role is that of Aurora in Éric Rohmer's Claire's Knee.

Biography
She was born in Provița de Jos, Prahova County, Romania. An independent spirit, she ran away three times from home, the last time permanently at the age of 14. She was adopted by an uncle. Her father died in prison after he was arrested for harboring a fugitive general of the defunct Romanian Royal Army (who was another of her uncles) for 11 years.

She graduated from the Mihai Eminescu Literary School in Bucharest, and worked for a while for the poetry section of Viața Românească while doing translations.

Her first husband was Marin Preda, to whom she was married between 1955 and 1959 (or 1960). She encouraged him to publish the novel Moromeții, whose manuscript she had found in a drawer.

Her fiancé in the mid-1960s, mathematician Tudor Ganea, did not succeed in getting her out of Romania, so she saw her chance to defect to the West while she was at the poetry festival in Knokke-Het Zoute, Belgium. She settled down in Paris, France, where, being destitute, Pierre Emmanuel's wife paid her rent for several years.

Between 1967 and 1978 she was a collaborator of Monica Lovinescu and Virgil Ierunca in their literary radio program aired by Radio Free Europe.

While living in France, she married Aurel Cornea, a Romanian-born French television sound engineer, who was held hostage in Lebanon by the pro-Iranian Shiite Islamic group known as the Revolutionary Justice Organization for ten and a half months in 1986.

She paid construction costs for a church located in Cornu, Prahova County. Its design was inspired by a Horia Damian drawing.

In later years, she lived in Paris and New York City. Cornu died in a hospital in Paris on 14 March 2021, at the age of 89.

Books
Studenta (1954)
Distanțe (1962)

Marin Preda, Scrisori către Aurora (1998)

Translations
Hamlet, under the pseudonym Ștefan Runcu in: William Shakespeare, Romeo și Julieta. Hamlet, București: Editura pentru Literatură, 1962, .

Filmography

References

External links

Interview with Aurora Cornu  

1931 births
2021 deaths
People from Prahova County
Romanian novelists
20th-century French novelists
21st-century French novelists
Romanian translators
Romanian film directors
Romanian women film directors
French film directors
French women film directors
French film actresses
Romanian actresses
Romanian expatriates in France
Romanian expatriates in the United States
Romanian defectors
20th-century translators
20th-century French women writers
21st-century French women writers
Deaths from the COVID-19 pandemic in France